Southern Steel (1953) is a novel by Australian writer Dymphna Cusack.

Story outline

Set in Newcastle, New South Wales, during World War II, the story concerns three brothers who all work at varying levels of a local steel maker.

See also

 1953 in Australian literature

References

Novels by Dymphna Cusack
1953 Australian novels